BQO may refer to:

 Better-quasi-ordering, a mathematical relation
 Balo language (by 639-3 language code)
 Tehini Airport (by IATA airport code)